Donna Savarese is two-time Emmy Award-winning former journalist. Savarese is a graduate of Fairfield University with a bachelor of arts degree in political science.

Career
As a journalist, Savarese anchored the 6 pm newscast at KMOV-TV in St. Louis, Missouri. Before that Savarese was the weekend anchor and reporter at KHWB-TV in Houston, Texas. Savarese also anchored newscasts at WJXX in Jacksonville, Florida, WFSB in Hartford, Connecticut and WWLP in Springfield, Massachusetts.

Awards

Savarese is a two-time Emmy award winner.  She won her first Emmy for taking viewers behind closed doors to profile an order of cloistered nuns known as the Poor Clares.  She won her second Emmy for her profile of Kimora Lee Simmons, the founder of the Baby Phat fashion line.  She is the recipient of seven Emmy nominations, including a nomination for "Best On Camera Talent" in 2007, and a nomination in sports for an interview with the St. Louis Cardinals' former batting coach battling an addiction.

Savarese has also received two Radio and Television News Directors Association (RTNDA) Edward R. Murrow Awards. "Remembering Riley", which aired in 2007, profiled a marine killed in the battle for Fallujah.  Her second Edward R. Murrow award, entitled "For the Love of Laura," profiled a young husband's commitment to his wife who was seriously injured in a car accident.

References

Fairfield University alumni
American television news anchors
1967 births
Living people